Winfield Scott Sherwood (1817 – June 25, 1870) was an American politician from New York and California.

He was a member of the New York State Assembly (Warren Co.) in 1846.

On July 14, 1849, Sherwood was elected a delegate to the California Constitutional Convention, and was one of the signers of the California Constitution of 1849. He ran against Peter H. Burnett in the first statewide election for Governor of California after Mexican rule in 1849, but he lost. He later became a district judge. He was a presidential elector in 1852.

References

California politicians
1817 births
1870 deaths
American judges
Members of the New York State Assembly
19th-century American politicians
19th-century American judges